Wolf-Eberhard Richter (born 5 June 1953) is a German sailor. He competed in the Star event at the 1980 Summer Olympics.

References

External links
 

1953 births
Living people
German male sailors (sport)
Olympic sailors of East Germany
Sailors at the 1980 Summer Olympics – Star
Sportspeople from Berlin